The Imp is a 1919 American silent crime film directed by Robert Ellis and starring Elsie Janis, Joe King, and Ethel Stewart.

Cast
 Elsie Janis as Jane Morgan 
 Joe King as The Leopard 
 Ethel Stewart as Jane's Mother 
 E.J. Ratcliffe as Jane's Father 
 Duncan Penwarden as Dr. James 
 Arthur Marion as The Butler 
 John Sutherland as The Deacon 
 William Frederic as The Warden 
 Edith Forrest as Maid 
 Joseph Granby as Hampden 
 Jack Ridgeway as Comedian 
 Ricardo Cortez as Extra

References

Bibliography
 Anthony Slide. The Encyclopedia of Vaudeville. University Press of Mississippi, 2012.

External links

1919 films
1919 crime films
American crime films
Films directed by Robert Ellis (actor, born 1892)
American silent feature films
1910s English-language films
Selznick Pictures films
American black-and-white films
1910s American films